Andrézieux-Bouthéon is a commune of the Loire department in central France. It lies on the right bank of the river Loire, at its confluence with the river Furan.

Population

Sights
 Le Château Bouthéon

International Relations

Andrézieux is twinned with:

 Neu-Isenburg, Germany
 Maia, Portugal
 Soham, England
 Chiusi, Italia

See also
 Saint-Étienne - Bouthéon Airport
 ASF Andrézieux
 Communes of the Loire department

References

Communes of Loire (department)